Six ships of the British Royal Navy have been named HMS Goliath after the Biblical giant, Goliath.

 The first  was a 74-gun third-rate that fought in the Battle of the Nile.
 The second HMS Goliath was renamed in 1826 prior to completion, becoming , an 84-gun ship of the line completed in 1827 and burnt in 1884.
 The third  was an 80-gun ship of the line, built in 1842. She was converted to screw propulsion in 1857 and burnt in 1875.
 The fourth  was a battleship launched in 1898 and sunk by the Ottoman torpedo boat  in 1915.
 The fifth and sixth Goliaths were tugs requisitioned for use during World War II.

Fictional ships

HMS Goliath is the name of a fictional Royal Navy submarine in the radio series Deep Trouble.
RMS Goliath is the name of a fictional transatlantic passenger liner in the 1981 two-part TV miniseries Goliath Awaits.

Royal Navy ship names